Ayawayq'u (Quechua aya corpse, wayq'u valley,  "corpse valley", also Ayawayq'o), also known as Yukay (Yucay) or Kapillayuq (Capillayoq) is an archaeological site with rock paintings in Peru. It is situated in the Cusco Region, Urubamba Province, Yucay District.

References 

Rock art in South America
Archaeological sites in Peru
Archaeological sites in Cusco Region